David Fernández (born 14 April 1996) is a Spanish handball player for Abanca Ademar León and the Spanish national team.

References

External Links

1996 births
Living people
Spanish male handball players
Sportspeople from Valladolid
Liga ASOBAL players
Expatriate handball players
Expatriate handball players in Poland
Spanish expatriate sportspeople in Poland
Wisła Płock (handball) players
21st-century Spanish people